Lester Wheeler (born c. 1931) is a former American football player and coach. A tackle from Abilene Christian College—now known as Abilene Christian University—he was selected by the Philadelphia Eagles in the 21st round of the 1952 NFL Draft.  After coaching at Lamesa High School in Lamesa, Texas, Wheeler returned to his alma mater in 1956 as line coach.  He was the ninth head football coach at Abilene Christian, serving for six seasons, from 1962 to 1967, and compiling a record of 30–27.

Head coaching record

References

Year of birth missing (living people)
1930s births
Living people
American football tackles
Abilene Christian Wildcats football coaches
Abilene Christian Wildcats football players
High school football coaches in Texas